Kim Jung-young ( born on 27 July 1972) is a South Korean actress. She made her acting debut in 2000 in films, since then, she has appeared in number of plays, films and television series. She got recognition for her supporting roles in Clean with Passion for Now (2018), Black Dog: Being A Teacher (2019), Jirisan, River Where the Moon Rises (2021) and Business Proposal (2022). She has acted in films such as: The Piper (2015), The King's Case Note (2017) and Our Body (2018) among others.

Career
At Sangmyung University Kim was a member of a playgroup and later she joined theater company Han River in 1995. She debuted in films in 2000 through Kim Ki-duk’s Real Fiction. After her first appearance, she did minor roles in the films such as Bungee Jumping of Their Own (2001) and an indie film Waikiki Brothers (2001). Then she got break in Bad Guy (2001) and 2003 NETPAC award winner of the Locarno International Film Festival, Spring, Summer, Fall, Winter... and Spring. Later she appeared in films such as Thread of Lies (2013), The Piper (2015), Lost to Shame (2016), Memoir of a Murderer (2017) and indie film Our Body (2018). Her television debut was in 2012 with a small role in How Long I've Kissed and then Secret Affair (2014).

In 2022, Kim appeared in romantic comedy Business Proposal, tvN's revenge melodrama Eve, and Coupang's psychological thriller Anna. She is also cast in JTBC's Bloody Romance, which will air in second half of 2022. In the same year, her film Gyeong-ah’s Daughter, which was screened at 23rd Jeonju International Film Festival won CGV Arthouse Award Distribution Support Prize and Watcha's Pick: Feature award at the festival.

Filmography

Films

Television series

Web series

Theater

References

External links
 
 
 
 Kim Jung-young on Daum 
 Kim Jung-young on Play DB

21st-century South Korean actresses
South Korean film actresses
South Korean television actresses
South Korean stage actresses
Living people
1972 births